George Dorsey may refer to:

 George Washington Emery Dorsey (1842–1911), Representative to the United States Congress from Nebraska
 George Amos Dorsey (1868–1931), U.S. ethnographer of indigenous peoples of the Americas
 George W. Dorsey, victim of the 1946 Georgia lynching